Riefensberg is a municipality in the district of Bregenz in the westernmost Austrian state of Vorarlberg. The community of Riefensberg covers an area of 14.85 square kilometers. Riefensberg is located within the Nagelfluhkette Nature Park.

Population

History 
The town of Riefensberg ("rivinsperc") was mentioned for the first time in 1249, in a document by Pope Innocent IV.

Culture 
The St. Leonhard parish church was built in 1426, enlarged between 1818 and 1821, and renovated from 1969 to 1971.

The St. Anna chapel was built in the 18th century and is rich in Baroque statues.

In 2010, a roughly 300-year-old millstone of the Auer Mill was found. Riefensberg had several mills from the 17th to the 19th centuries. The grinding stone is exhibited on a walking route.

In the Juppenwerkstatt Riefensberg, traditional Bregenz Forest costumes are still dyed and sewn. The typical "Bregenzerwälder Juppe" is not sold "ready-made" in shops, but can only be custom-made in the Juppenwerkstatt. Nowadays, many Bregenzerwälder women wear the Juppe at weddings and in church on Sundays.

External links 

 Website of the municipality
 Website of the Juppenwerkstatt Riefensberg

References

Cities and towns in Bregenz District